John or Jack Phelan may refer to:

John J. Phelan (1851–1936), Supreme Knight of the Knights of Columbus and Secretary of the State of Connecticut
John J. Phelan (boxing) (1872–1946), American boxing commissioner and military officer who served as chairman of the New York State Athletic Commission and was a Major General in the New York Army National Guard.
John J. Phelan Jr. (1931–2012), American financier who served as president and later chairman and chief executive of the New York Stock Exchange
John Paul Phelan (born 1978), Irish Fine Gael politician
John Leddy Phelan (1924–1976), Beveridge Award-winning author of The People and the King: The Comunero Revolution in Colombia, 1781
John Dennis Phelan (1809–1879), jurist and politician in the southern United States
Jack Phelan (basketball, born 1925) (1925–2021), American professional basketball player for the Waterloo Hawks and Sheboygan Red Skins
Jack Phelan (basketball, born 1954) (1954–2020), American college basketball coach of the University of Hartford